John D. Maurice is an American journalist.  He won the 1975 Pulitzer Prize for Editorial Writing for his editorials about the Kanawha County schoolbook controversy.

Maurice worked as a reporter in Huntington, West Virginia, prior to joining the Daily Mail of Charleston, West Virginia, in 1938.

References 

Pulitzer Prize for Editorial Writing winners
Living people
Year of birth missing (living people)
Journalists from West Virginia